A marine park is a designated park consisting of an area of sea (or lake) set aside to achieve ecological sustainability, promote marine awareness and understanding, enable marine recreational activities, and provide benefits for Indigenous peoples and coastal communities. Most marine parks are managed by national governments, and organized like 'watery' national parks, whereas marine protected areas and marine reserves are often managed by a subnational entity or non-governmental organization, such as a conservation authority.

The largest marine park used to be the Great Barrier Reef Marine Park in Australia, at 350,000 km² until 2010, when the United Kingdom announced the opening of the Chagos Marine Park or Chagos Archipelago.

Although for many uses it is sufficient to designate the boundaries of the marine park and to inform commercial fishing boats and other maritime enterprises, some parks have gone to additional effort to make their wonders accessible to visitors.  These can range from glass-bottomed boats and small submarines, to windowed undersea tubes.

In New Zealand a marine reserve is an area which has a higher degree of legal protection than marine parks for conservation purposes.

In New South Wales, there are planned marine parks which will stretch along the coastline of the entire state.

List of marine parks

Africa
Glorioso Islands Marine Natural Park, Glorioso Islands
Kisite-Mpunguti Marine National Park, Kenya
Mayotte Marine Natural Park, Mayotte

Americas
Bonaire National Marine Park, Bonaire
Half Moon Caye Natural Monument, Belize
Hol Chan Marine Reserve, Belize
Montego Bay Marine Park, Jamaica
Pedra da Risca do Meio Marine State Park, Brazil
Martinique Marine Natural Park, Martinique
Saba National Marine Park, Saba

Canada
Fathom Five National Marine Park
Gwaii Haanas National Marine Conservation Area Reserve
Lake Superior National Marine Conservation Area
Saguenay–St. Lawrence Marine Park

Mexico
Alto Golfo de California Biosphere Reserve
Arrecifes de Cozumel National Park
Cabo Pulmo National Park, Mexico
San Lorenzo Marine Archipelago National Park

United States 
Allan H. Treman State Marine Park
Dry Tortugas National Park
John Pennekamp Coral Reef State Park
Thunder Bay National Marine Sanctuary

Asia

Hong Kong
Marine parks in Hong Kong:
Cape D'Aguilar Marine Reserve 
Hoi Ha Wan Marine Park 
Sha Chau and Lung Kwu Chau Marine Park 
Tung Ping Chau Marine Park 
Yan Chau Tong Marine Park

India
Gulf of Mannar Marine National Park, Tamil Nadu
Marine National Park, Gulf of Kachchh, Gujarat

Indonesia
Karimunjawa National Park, Java
Kepulauan Seribu National Park, Java
Komodo National Park, Nusa Tenggara
Bunaken National Park, Sulawesi
Kepulauan Togean National Park, Sulawesi
Kepulauan Wakatobi National Park, Sulawesi
Taka Bone Rate National Park, Sulawesi
Teluk Cenderawasih National Park, Papua

Japan
Inubōsaki Marine Park

Malaysia
Perhentian Islands
Redang Island
Pulau Tenggol
Tioman Island
Pulau Sibu
Pulau Pemanggil
Tunku Abdul Rahman National Park
Tun Mustapha Marine Park
Tun Sakaran Marine Park
Turtle Islands National Park

Philippines
Apo Reef 
Tubbataha Reef
Ocean Adventure

Singapore
Sisters' Island Marine Park

Taiwan
Dongsha Atoll National Park
South Penghu Marine National Park

Thailand

Tarutao National Marine Park

Europe
Karaburun-Sazan National Marine Park, Albania
Marine Natural Park of Cap Corse and the Agriate, Cap Corse and the Agriates, Corsica
Arcachon Bay Marine Natural Park, Arcachon Bay, France
Gironde Estuary and Pertuis Sea Marine Natural Park, western France
Gulf of Lion Marine Natural Park, Gulf of Lion, France
Iroise Marine Natural Park, Brittany, France
Marine Natural Park of the Picardy Estuaries and the Opal Sea, Picardy and Côte d'Opale, France 
Zakynthos Marine Park, Greece
Alonnisos Marine Park, Greece
Kosterhavet National Park, Bohuslän, Sweden
Ytre Hvaler National Park, Norway
Færder National Park, Norway
Jomfruland National Park, Norway
Raet National Park, Norway
Pembrokeshire Coast National Park, Wales
Plymouth Sound National Marine Park, England
Ponta Do Pargo Marine Natural Park, Madeira, Portugal
Cape Girão Marine Natural Park, Madeira, Portugal

High seas
Nearly all existing marine reserves have been set close to shore, mostly in territorial waters. A main reason for this lies in the fragmented nature of maritime governance in international waters, the poor enforcement of existing regulations in the High seas, plus the difficult co-management that would be required of countries often in conflict. How to circumvent such obstacles? In 2011, based on unique biological, geological and oceanographic features, the Mediterranean Science Commission proposed the creation of eight large international, coast-to coast "Marine Peace Parks" in the Mediterranean Sea where no coastal point is farther than 200 nautical miles from waters under another jurisdiction. The trans-frontier structure of such 'Peace' Parks puts this problem aside, encouraging the local Governments involved to join forces in the pursuit of a cause higher than their national interest without prejudice to current national claims .
 
 Greenpeace is campaigning for the "doughnut holes" of the western pacific to be declared as marine reserves. 
They are also campaigning for 40 percent of the world’s oceans to be protected as marine reserves.

Oceania

Australia

Australian government

The Australian Government manages an estate of marine protected areas (MPA) that are Commonwealth reserves under the Environment Protection and Biodiversity Conservation Act 1999 (EPBC Act).
Ashmore Reef Marine National Nature Reserve 
Cartier Island Marine Reserve
Cod Grounds Commonwealth Marine Reserve
Coringa-Herald National Nature Reserve
Elizabeth and Middleton Reefs Marine National Nature Reserve
Great Australian Bight Commonwealth Marine Reserve
Great Barrier Reef Marine Park 
Heard Island and McDonald Islands Marine Reserve
Kimberley Marine Park
Lihou Reef National Nature Reserve (Coral Sea Island Territory)
Lord Howe Island Marine Park (Commonwealth Waters)
Macquarie Island Marine Park
Mermaid Reef Marine National Nature Reserve
Ningaloo Marine Park (Commonwealth waters)
Solitary Islands Marine Reserve (Commonwealth Waters)
South-east Commonwealth Marine Reserve Network

New South Wales
 Solitary Islands Marine Park

Queensland
Moreton Bay Marine Park

South Australia

As of December 2013, the following marine parks have been declared under the Marine Parks Act 2007 (SA) :

Eastern Spencer Gulf Marine Park
Encounter Marine Park
Far West Coast Marine Park
Franklin Harbor Marine Park
Gambier Islands Group Marine Park
Investigator Marine Park
Lower South East Marine Park
Lower Yorke Peninsula Marine Park
Neptune Islands Group Marine Park
Nuyts Archipelago Marine Park
Sir Joseph Banks Group Marine Park
Southern Kangaroo Island Marine Park
Southern Spencer Gulf Marine Park]]
Thorny Passage Marine Park
Upper Gulf St Vincent Marine Park
Upper South East Marine Park
Upper Spencer Gulf Marine Park
West Coast Bays Marine Park
Western Kangaroo Island Marine Park

Victoria

The state of Victoria has protected approximately 5.3% of coastal waters. In June 2002, legislation was passed to establish 13 Marine National Parks and 11 Marine Sanctuaries. Victoria is
the first jurisdiction in the world to create an entire system of highly protected Marine National Parks at the same time. Additional areas are listed as Marine Parks or Marine Reserves, which provides a lower level of protection and allows activities such as commercial and recreational fishing.

The marine national parks are:
Bunurong Marine National Park
Cape Howe Marine National Park
Churchill Island Marine National Park
Corner Inlet Marine National Park
Discovery Bay Marine National Park
French Island Marine National Park
Ninety Mile Beach Marine National Park
Point Addis Marine National Park
Point Hicks Marine National Park
Port Phillip Heads Marine National Park
Twelve Apostles Marine National Park
Wilsons Promontory Marine National Park
Yaringa Marine National Park

Western Australia
Kimberley region:
 Bardi Jawi Marine Park (proposed), in Bardi Jawi country.
Lalang-gaddam Marine Park (in planning stages; formerly Great Kimberley Marine Park), which will cover Dambimangari waters:
Lalang-garram / Camden Sound Marine Park
Lalang-garram / Horizontal Falls Marine Park
North Lalang-garram Marine Park
Maiyalam Marine Park (gazetted 2020/21), covering the Buccaneer Archipelago 
North Kimberley Marine Park, in Uunguu waters.
Gascoyne region:
Shark Bay Marine Park

Micronesia
Enipein Pah, near Pohnpei

New Zealand
Hauraki Gulf Marine Park
Mimiwhangata Marine Park
Tawharanui Marine Park

Papua New Guinea
Papua Barrier Reef

See also
Marine protected area
Marine reserve

References

 
Protected areas